The Pornographer is a 2001 erotic drama film written and directed by Bertrand Bonello, who co-wrote the music score with Laurie Markovitch. The film features an explicit sex scene with two pornographic actors, Ovidie and Titof. It won the FIPRESCI Prize (International Critics Week) at the 2001 Cannes Film Festival and was nominated for the Bronze Horse at the Stockholm Film Festival.

Synopsis 
Jacques Laurent is a former director of pornographic films, once active in the 1970s. Due to financial hardships, he comes out of retirement and resumes his career in porn, only to discover that the industry has changed.

Cast
 Jean-Pierre Léaud as Jacques Laurent
 Jérémie Renier as Joseph
 Dominique Blanc as Jeanne
 Catherine Mouchet as Olivia Rochet
 Thibault de Montalembert as Richard
 André Marcon as Louis
  as Monika
 Ovidie as Jenny
 Titof as Franck
 Laurent Lucas as Carles

See also
 List of mainstream films with unsimulated sex
 Boogie Nights
 Lovelace, a 2012 film about Deep Throats star Linda Lovelace.

References

External links
 
 
 The Pornographer at Films de France

2001 films
2001 drama films
2000s erotic drama films
2000s French-language films
Canadian erotic drama films
Films about pornography
Films directed by Bertrand Bonello
Films with screenplays by Bertrand Bonello
French erotic drama films
French-language Canadian films
New French Extremity films
2000s Canadian films
2000s French films